The following is a list of notable events and releases that happened in 2013 in music in South Korea.

Debuting and disbanded in 2013

Debuting groups

2Eyes
2Yoon
5urprise
Acourve
AlphaBat
AOA Black
Bestie
Boys Republic
BTS
Danpyunsun and the Sailors
GI
History
Infinite H
Ladies' Code
LC9
MFBTY
M.Pire
Pungdeng-E
QBS
Royal Pirates
Speed
T-ara N4
Topp Dogg
Wassup

Solo debuts

Andrew Choi
Bada Kim
CL
Eric Nam
Hoody
ICON
Kang Seung-yoon
Kim Jae-joong
Lee Jin-ah
Lil Kim
Mayson the Soul
NC.A
Olltii
Sunmi
Z.Hera

Disbanded groups
 Coed School
 D-Unit
 DMTN
 N-Train
The RockTigers
 Supreme Team

Releases in 2013

First quarter

January

February

March

Second quarter

April

May

June

Third quarter

July

August

September

Fourth quarter

October

November

December

Deaths
 Kim Ji-hoon, singer-songwriter & actor; former member of Two Two (1994–1996,) and Duke (2002–2007)
 Rottyful Sky, singer, producer, and actress (Roo'ra (2006–2007); MADmoiselle (2009))

Charts
List of number-one hits of 2013 (South Korea)
List of number-one albums of 2013 (South Korea)
List of Korea K-Pop Hot 100 number-one singles

See also
2013 in South Korea
List of South Korean films of 2013

References

South Korean music
K-pop